Dustin Brown and Jan-Lennard Struff are the defending champions, but only Struff defended his title partnering Frank Moser.

Seeds

Draw

References
 Main Draw

Pekao Szczecin Open - Doubles
2015 Doubles
2015 in Polish tennis